Anaso Jobodwana (born 30 July 1992) is a South African sprinter. He competed in 200 metres at the 2012 Summer Olympics in London where he ran a new personal best of 20.27 seconds to reach the final.

In the 2015 World Championships in Beijing, Jobodwana won bronze in the 200m final, with a national record time of 19.87s.

Jobodwana competed in the 200 m at the 2016 Summer Olympics in Rio de Janeiro. He finished 4th in his heat with a time of 20.53 seconds. He did not qualify for the semifinals. This South African athlete is yet to soar to even greater heights.

He competed in the men's 200 metres event at the 2020 Summer Olympics.

References

External links

1992 births
Living people
People from Dr Beyers Naudé Local Municipality
South African male sprinters
Athletes (track and field) at the 2012 Summer Olympics
Athletes (track and field) at the 2016 Summer Olympics
Olympic athletes of South Africa
World Athletics Championships athletes for South Africa
World Athletics Championships medalists
Universiade medalists in athletics (track and field)
Alumni of Selborne College
Athletes (track and field) at the 2018 Commonwealth Games
Commonwealth Games medallists in athletics
Commonwealth Games silver medallists for South Africa
Universiade gold medalists for South Africa
Athletes (track and field) at the 2019 African Games
South African Athletics Championships winners
African Games medalists in athletics (track and field)
African Games bronze medalists for South Africa
Medalists at the 2013 Summer Universiade
Athletes (track and field) at the 2020 Summer Olympics
20th-century South African people
21st-century South African people
Medallists at the 2018 Commonwealth Games